is a former Japanese football player.

Playing career
Yamaguchi was born in Nagasaki Prefecture on September 8, 1977. After graduating from high school, he joined J1 League club Sanfrecce Hiroshima in 1996. However he could hardly play in the match behind Kazuya Maekawa and Takashi Shimoda until 1998. In 1999, he moved to newly was promoted to J2 League club, Sagan Tosu. However he could hardly play in the match behind Riki Takasaki from 2000. In 2001, Takasaki left the club and Yamaguchi became a regular goalkeeper. However lost his regular position behind Junnosuke Schneider and he retired end of 2002 season.

Club statistics

References

External links

biglobe.ne.jp

1977 births
Living people
Association football people from Nagasaki Prefecture
Japanese footballers
J1 League players
J2 League players
Sanfrecce Hiroshima players
Sagan Tosu players
Association football goalkeepers